The Eyes of the World or Eyes of the World may refer to:

Film
The Eyes of the World, 1917 American silent drama co-starring Jack Livingston, based on Harold Bell Wright's 1914 novel
The Eyes of the World (1920 film), German silent starring Conrad Veidt
The Eyes of the World (1930 film), American sound version of Harold Bell Wright's 1914 novel

Literature
The Eyes of the World, 1914 American novel by Harold Bell Wright

Music
"Eyes of the World", song by Grateful Dead on their 1973 album Wake of the Flood
"Eyes of the World", song by Rainbow on their 1979 album Down to Earth
"Eyes of the World", song by Fleetwood Mac on their 1982 album Mirage
Eyes of the World (album), 1990 album by MacAlpine
"Eyes of the World", song by Stratovarius on their 1994 album Dreamspace
"Eyes of the World", song by Freedom Call from their 2003 album, Eternity

See also
 The Eye of the World, 1990 science fiction–fantasy novel by Robert Jordan